Hans Boelsen (6 March 1894 – 24 October 1960) was a general in the Wehrmacht of Nazi Germany during World War II. He was a recipient of the Knight's Cross of the Iron Cross. During his time in command of the 114th Jäger Division, the unit was complicit in two massacres in Italy, in the towns of Filetto di Camarda and Gubbio. Boelsen was never prosecuted for these crimes.

Awards and decorations

 German Cross in Gold on 17 November 1941 as Oberstleutnant in Kradschützen-Bataillon 160 (motorized)
 Knight's Cross of the Iron Cross on 17 September 1943 as Oberst and commander of Panzergrenadier-Regiment 111

References

Citations

Bibliography

1894 births
1960 deaths
20th-century Freikorps personnel
German Army personnel of World War I
German prisoners of war in World War II
Lieutenant generals of the German Army (Wehrmacht)
People from Emden
People from the Province of Hanover
Recipients of the clasp to the Iron Cross, 1st class
Recipients of the Gold German Cross
Recipients of the Knight's Cross of the Iron Cross
Military personnel from Lower Saxony
Nazi war criminals